Captain Howdy may refer to:

 Pazuzu (The Exorcist), named "Captain Howdy" during the early stages of demonic possession
 Captain Howdy (band), a 1990s alternative rock band
 "Captain Howdy", a song by Twisted Sister from the album Stay Hungry and covered by Crisis
 "Captain Howdy", a 1974 song by Simon Stokes
 Captain Howdy, a character in the film Strangeland, based on the song by Twisted Sister and starring Twisted Sister frontman Dee Snider
 Captain Howdy, a character in the 1983 film Hysterical